La Gorgue is a town in northern France. It is a commune in the Nord department. The population of La Gorgue in 2019 was 5,639.

It was the location of the Beaupré-sur-la-Lys Abbey, founded in 1221, whose grounds were used as a Royal Flying Corps base during World War I.

History
 is in La Gorgue. The monastery was founded in 1221 by two lords of Béthune, one of whom, Robert, was a constable of King John. After joining the Cistercian Order some years later, Beaupré and its community of nearly 40 nuns continued to live undisturbed French Revolution in 1789, when it was dismantled.

Later archaeological excavations revealed parts of the monastery, and much of this is now on exhibition in La Gorgue, including tombstones, decorated paving, coins and various archaeological artefacts.

During World War I, Beaupré farmland was used by the Royal Air Force as an aerodrome and was home to many squadrons, including No. 16 squadron under Hugh Dowding and No. 8 (Naval) Squadron, which became No. 208 Squadron RAF. From 12 May to 6 July 1917,  No. 46 Squadron was based there. From 19 August to 5 October 1917, No. 35 Squadron was based at La Gorgue. Other squadrons based at La Gorgue at different times during the course of the war were No.5, No.15, No. 42 and No. 43.

In September 2018, the town hosted an exhibition and a ceremony attended by family members of pilots who had served at the aerodrome during the Great War, organised by Serge Comini.

Location and governance
La Gorgue lies on to the south of the river Lys, straddling its tributary the Lawe.

It is a commune in the Nord department, which lies within the region of Hauts-de-France, and the capital city of both the department and region is Lille. La Gorge lies within the arrondissement of Dunkerque, and the canton of Hazebrouck.

Population

Heraldry

See also
Communes of the Nord department
French Flanders

References

External links

Communes of Nord (French department)
Monasteries
French Flanders